Chandar (Sandar) is a rural locality (a village) in Krasnoklyuchevsky Selsoviet, Nurimanovsky District, Bashkortostan, Russia. The population was 220 as of 2010. There are 6 streets.

Geography 
Chandar is located 16 km north of Krasnaya Gorka (the district's administrative centre) by road. Emanino is the nearest rural locality.

References 

Rural localities in Nurimanovsky District